Göztepe is an underground station on the M4 line of the Istanbul Metro. Located under beneath the Göztepe Interchange in the Merdivenköy neighborhood of Kadıköy, Istanbul, it was opened on 17 August 2012.

Station Layout

References

External links
Göztepe station portal in Google Street View

Railway stations opened in 2012
Istanbul metro stations
Transport in Kadıköy
2012 establishments in Turkey